3-Methyl-PCPy (3-Me-PCPy) is an arylcyclohexylamine derivative with an unusual spectrum of pharmacological effects, acting as both a potent NMDA antagonist and also a triple reuptake inhibitor which inhibits reuptake of all three monoamine neurotransmitters serotonin, dopamine and noradrenaline. It also acts as a high affinity sigma receptor ligand, selective for the σ2 subtype. It produces both stimulant and dissociative effects in animal behavioural studies.

Legal Status
3-Methyl-PCPy is covered by drug analogue laws in various jurisdictions (UK, Germany, Japan, Australia etc) as a generic arylcyclohexylamine derivative, and a structural isomer of phencyclidine.

See also
 3-Methyl-PCP
 BTCP
 Deoxymethoxetamine
 Ephenidine
 MDPCP

References 

Arylcyclohexylamines
NMDA receptor antagonists
Serotonin–norepinephrine–dopamine reuptake inhibitors